The 1947 Lower Hutt mayoral election was part of the New Zealand local elections held that same year. The elections were held for the role of Mayor of Lower Hutt plus other local government positions including twelve city councillors, also elected triennially. The polling was conducted using the standard first-past-the-post electoral method.

Background
The winner of the previous mayoral election, Jack Andrews, resigned towards the end of his fifth term. The council did not hold a by-election due to the closeness to the regularly scheduled election and instead the councillors elected Ernst Peterson Hay in June 1947 to finish the remainder of the term. Hay stood in the election where he was opposed by Labour's Henry "Harry" Saunders who was the chairman of the Boulcott School Committee and president of the Epuni-Waiwhetu branch of the Labour Party.  Taking place during a period of rapid population growth in the area, it was the first election after the addition of the new suburb of Taita. Hay won the mayoralty and Saunders was elected a member of both the Hutt Valley Electric Power Board and Petone and Lower Hutt Gas Board, serving for just over a year until his death in December 1948.

Mayoral results

Councillor results

Notes

References

Mayoral elections in Lower Hutt
1947 elections in New Zealand
Politics of the Wellington Region